Teracotona proditrix is a type of moth in the family Erebidae. It was described by Emilio Berio in 1939. It is found in Eritrea and Ethiopia.

References

External links
Arctiidae genus list at Butterflies and Moths of the World of the Natural History Museum

Moths described in 1939
Spilosomina